The Union of Monaco Trade Unions (USM) is a national trade union center in Monaco. It is affiliated with the World Federation of Trade Unions.

References

External links
 Official site 

Trade unions in Monaco